Treinta y Tres is a department of Uruguay. Its capital is Treinta y Tres. It is located in the east of the country, bordering the departments of Cerro Largo to the north,  Durazno and Florida to the west, Lavalleja and Rocha to the south, while to its east is the lake Laguna Merín separating it from the southernmost end of Brazil.

History
When the First Constitution of Uruguay was signed in 1830, the territory of this department was mostly part of Cerro Largo, one of the nine original departments of the Republic. In 1853 the pueblo (village) of Treinta y Tres was created in its south. It was named after the thirty three honoured patriots who fought for and secured the Independence of the old Provincia Oriental, which became Uruguay. A permanent service of transport by horse-drawn carts between this pueblo and Montevideo was first established in 1866.

On 18 September 1884 and by the Act of Ley No 1.754, the department of Treinta y Tres was created out of parts of the departments of Cerro Largo and Minas (the actual Lavalleja Department).

Demographics

As of the census of 2011, Treinta y Tres department had a population of 48,134 (23,416 male and 24,718 female) and 21,462 households

Demographic data for Treinta y Tres Department in 2010:
Population growth rate: -0.158%
Birth Rate: 13.80 births/1,000 people
Death Rate: 9.15 deaths/1,000 people
Average age: 33.7 (32.7 male, 34.6 female)
Life Expectancy at Birth:
Total population: 75.97 years
Male: 72.16 years
Female: 79.90 years
Average per household income: 23,122 pesos/month
Urban per capita income: 8,994 pesos/month
2010 Data Source:

Tourism
A notable natural landmark is the Quebrada de los Cuervos, 44 km east of the capital city.

Map of the department

Notable people
Luis Antonio Hierro López - former Vice President of Uruguay
Luis Hierro Gambardella - former Minister, Senator and Deputy
Luis Hierro - former Deputy

See also
 List of populated places in Uruguay#Treinta y Tres Department

References

External links

INE map of Treinta y Tres Department
Nuestra Terra, Colección Los Departamentos, Vol.4 "Treinta y Tres"

 
Departments of Uruguay
States and territories established in 1884